The Florence Nightingale David Award is an award given every two years (in odd-numbered years) jointly by the Committee of Presidents of Statistical Societies and Caucus for Women in Statistics to a distinguished female statistician.

Description
The award's purpose is to "recognize a female statistician who exemplifies the contributions of Florence Nightingale David" and who "has advanced the discipline and proven herself to be an outstanding role model". Since the founding of the award, it has become a "prestigious hallmark of achievement" among female statisticians.

Winners
The Florence Nightingale David Award was first given in 2001, with David herself being given the award retroactively, dated to 1994. The winners of the award have been:

References

Statistical awards
Awards established in 2001
Science awards honoring women